Xylokastro railway station is a station in Xylokastro, a seaside town in Corinthia, Greece. It is located just south of Xylokastro, close to the Olimpia Odos motorway. It was opened on 22 June 2020 as part of the €848-million ErgOSE project extension of the Athens Airport–Patras railway to Aigio rail line, co-financed by the European Union's Cohesion Fund 2000–2006. It should not be confused with the now-closed station on the old Piraeus–Patras railway, which is located northeast of the current station, closer to the coast of the Corinthian Gulf.

History
The Station opened 22 June 2020 by Minister of Transport, Kostas Karamanlis. as part of the €848-million ErgOSE project extension of the Athens Airport–Patras railway to Aigio railline co-financed by the European Union's Cohesion Fund 2000–2006. It was one of three new stations in (Xylokastro, Akrata, and Aegio) and six holts (Diminio, Lykoporia, Lygia, Platanos Beach, Diakopto, and Eliki) to come online when the section of track opened. It should not be confused with the now-closed station on the old Piraeus–Patras railway SPAP, which is located northeast of the current station, closer to the coast of the Corinthian Gulf. In 2022 it will become the terminal of the Athens Suburban Railway when the electrification of this section is completed.

Facilities
The raised station is assessed via stairs or a ramp. It has one side platform and one island platform, with station buildings located on platform 1, with access to the platform level via stairs or lifts. The Station buildings are equipped with a booking office (not yet operational) and toilets. At platform level, there are sheltered seating, an air-conditioned indoor passenger shelter (as of 2020 not open) and Dot-matrix display departure and arrival screens and timetable poster boards on both platforms. There is a large car park on-site, adjacent to the eastbound line. Currently, there is no local bus stop connecting the station.

Services
Since 15 May 2022, this station serves the following routes:

In 2022 it will become the terminal of the Athens Suburban Railway when the electrification of this section is completed.

Accidents and incidents

2020 accident
On 20 August 2020, a train derailed close to Xylokastro station for reasons not immediately clear, There were no reports of any injuries resulting from the incident, the cause of which was to be the subject of an investigation.

Station layout

See also
Railway stations in Greece
Hellenic Railways Organization
Hellenic Train
Proastiakos

References

External links
 Xylokastro railway station - National Railway Network Greek Travel Pages

Xylokastro
Corinthia
Buildings and structures in Corinthia
Railway stations in Corinthia
Railway stations opened in 2020